Glenea quatuordecimmaculata is a species of beetle in the family Cerambycidae. It was described by Frederick William Hope in 1831. It is known from Nepal, Bhutan and India.

References

quatuordecimmaculata
Beetles described in 1831